The GP Wolber was a French cycling event in the 1920s. It was considered a kind of unofficial World Championship. Only cyclists who finished in the top-3 of the major French, Italian, Belgian and Swiss races were invited. The first GP Wolber was held in 1922. When the World Cycling Championship was introduced in 1927 the race started to lose prestige. The race ran until at least 1939.

Palmares

Notes

Recurring sporting events established in 1922
1922 establishments in France
Cycle races in France
Defunct cycling races in France
Recurring sporting events disestablished in 1931
Men's road bicycle races
1931 disestablishments in France